Henry Archer Ekers (8 September 1855 – 1 February 1927) was a Canadian industrialist and politician, the Mayor of Montreal, Quebec between 1906 and 1908. He ran unsuccessfully for the House of Commons of Canada as a Conservative in 1900 and 1908.

Biography 

Ekers' parents were both born in England. Relocated to Montreal, his father became a brewery owner, working from St. Lawrence Boulevard.

He was educated at the Montreal Collegiate School before joining his father's company, Ekers Brewery. Ekers eventually founded National Breweries Limited.

Political career 

Ekers represented the St. Lawrence ward on Montreal city council.

Gallery

References

External links
Henry Archer Ekers at City of Montreal

1855 births
1927 deaths
Mayors of Montreal
Burials at Mount Royal Cemetery